is the forty-fifth single of Japanese recording artist Gackt, released on October 1, 2014. It is the theme song for Square Enix's role-playing game 3594e for iOS.

Overview 
On the new single, Gackt collaborated with Square Enix for the release of their iOS game 3594e, based after the story of Romance of the Three Kingdoms, a Chinese historical novel. The in-game playable character, military general Lü Bu, was voiced by him. 

The song is the last installment of four songs from the first chapter of "Moon Saga", along with "Setsugekka (The End of Silence)" from 2009, "Hakuro" from 2012, and "Sakura Chiru..." from 2013.

The single was released in several editions. The usual CD-only edition, limited edition with bonus DVD, and Tsutaya edition, available only at Tsutaya stores and is the usual CD-only edition, but with different cover. Besides these, previously through Gackt's global store was available for preorder a limited premium edition with a CD jacket of a life-sized body pillow and additional quartet version of the song. Like Gackt's previous single, it's available for digital download in all major online stores all over the world.

Track listings and formats 

Tsutaya (GLCD-00008)

Charts

References

2014 singles
Gackt songs